Northeast Ohio Medical University (NEOMED) is a public medical school in Rootstown, Ohio. It specializes in graduate education in medicine and pharmacy but also has a College of Graduate Studies.

Its medical school has partnerships with four public universities (Akron, Cleveland State, Kent State, and Youngstown State) and one private college (Hiram). It also has 24 hospital partners, while the pharmacy school has over 100 pharmacy partners. The class size has grown to around 160 medical and 80 pharmacy students.

History

The medical university was begun by Leonard Caccamo, who became its first chairman of the Board of Trustees. As medical director of St. Elizabeth Hospital in Youngstown, Ohio, he began the planning for the university. He was assisted by Harry Meshel, then majority leader of the Ohio Senate. With the assistance of Lyle Williams, Congressman for the Ohio 17th district, a feasibility study was begun in concert with the Youngstown Hospital Association to address a regional need for primary care physicians and use existing facilities at the state universities and hospitals in the area. Based on that initial study a three-city consortium of Akron, Canton, and Youngstown was developed with the University of Akron, Kent State University, and Youngstown State University. Cleveland State University was added in 2008.

The school was established as the Northeastern Ohio Universities College of Medicine (NEOUCOM) by the Ohio state legislature in 1973, and the campus site in Rootstown along Ohio State Route 44 near Interstate 76 was selected in 1974 with groundbreaking in December 1975. The first class was selected in September 1977 and included 42 students from UA, KSU, and YSU in a combined B.S./M.D. program. They graduated in 1981, the same year the school became fully accredited.

The College of Pharmacy, approved in 2005, was inaugurated with 75 students in August 2007 in the Doctor of Pharmacy degree program, and the school's name was changed accordingly to the Northeastern Ohio Universities Colleges of Medicine and Pharmacy. In keeping with the school's rural setting, the Doctor of Pharmacy program has a community pharmacy emphasis. In May 2011, the university graduated its inaugural class of 61 pharmacists.

The university has collaborative arrangements with other colleges and universities to offer graduate-level education in biomedical sciences and biomedical engineering.

Jay A. Gershen, D.D.S, began his term as president of the university on January 15, 2010. In his February 2010 address, he announced a name-change for the university to Northeast Ohio Medical University (NEOMED).  This was signed into law on April 29, 2011.

Accreditation 
The College of Medicine is accredited by the Liaison Committee on Medical Education and the College of Pharmacy is accredited by the Accreditation Council for Pharmacy Education. The Master of Public Health program is accredited by the Council on Education for Public Health.

Campus

General campus amenities located within the original, twentieth century buildings include a bookstore, a biomedical library, research labs, and a landscaped courtyard.

The NEOMED Education and Wellness Center (NEW Center) houses a fitness center, bistro, coffee shop, and conference space, as well as physical therapy and childcare services. There are also plans to contain a pharmacy and medical offices through partnerships. The third floor of the NEW Center is home to the Bio-Med Science Academy, a STEM public school for grades 7–12. On the northern edge of campus, the university offers on-campus housing for professional students, faculty, and staff in The Village at NEOMED, which opened in 2014.

Bio-Med Science Academy

In August 2012, Northeast Ohio Medical University opened Bio-Med Science Academy, a public high school with a Science, Technology, Engineering, and Math (STEM) curriculum and an additional focus on medicine (STEM+M). The first class had 70 students with successive freshmen classes added each school year. As of August 2015, enrollment is approximately 400 students in grades 9–12.

Notable alumni
 Amy Acton, M.D. (1990), director of Ohio Department of Health during the COVID-19 pandemic
 Angela Funovits (2013), magician who performed on NBC's Phenomenon
 Crystal Mackall, MD (1985) Ernest and Amelia Gallo Family Professor and Professor of Pediatrics and of Medicine, Stanford University
 Amit Majmudar, M.D. (2003), Ohio's first Poet Laureate

Notable faculty
 Frederick Frese, psychologist and schizophrenia researcher.
 C. Owen Lovejoy, anthropologist who reconstructed Lucy (Australopithecus).
 Hans Thewissen, paleontologist who discovered Ambulocetus natans, which inspired the NEOMED mascot, Nate the Walking Whale.

See also
 University System of Ohio
 Medical education in the United States
 List of medical schools in the United States
 List of pharmacy schools in the United States

References

External links
 Official website

Medical schools in Ohio
Public universities and colleges in Ohio
University of Akron
Cleveland State University
Kent State University
Youngstown State University
Pharmacy schools in Ohio
Education in Portage County, Ohio
Educational institutions established in 1973
Buildings and structures in Portage County, Ohio
1973 establishments in Ohio